Ojamaa is an Estonian language surname meaning "stream/brook land". As of January 2019, there were 289 people with the surname within the country: 137 men and 147 women. Ojamaa is ranked as the 541th most common surname in Estonia. People bearing the surname Ojamaa include:

Andres Ojamaa (1969–1993), Estonian badminton player
Henrik Ojamaa (born 1991), Estonian footballer 
Hindrek Ojamaa (born 1995), Estonian footballer
Liisi Ojamaa (1972–2019), Estonian poet, translator, literary critic and editor

References

Estonian-language surnames